Egypt–Mesopotamia relations were the relations between the civilisations of ancient Egypt and Mesopotamia, in the Middle East. They seem to have developed from the 4th millennium BCE, starting in the Uruk period for Mesopotamia (circa 4000–3100 BCE) and the half a millennium younger Gerzean culture of Prehistoric Egypt (circa 3500–3200 BCE), and constituted a largely one way body of influences from Mesopotamia into Egypt.

Prior to a specific Mesopotamian influence there had already been a longstanding influence from West Asia into Egypt, North Africa and even into some parts of the Horn of Africa and the Sahel in the form of the Neolithic Revolution which from circa 9000 BCE diffused advanced agricultural practices and technology, gene-flow, certain animals and possibly Proto-Afroasiatic language into the region.

Mesopotamian influences can be seen in the visual arts of Egypt, in architecture, in technology, weaponry, in imported products and livestock, and also in the likely transfer of writing from Mesopotamia to Egypt and generated "deep-seated" parallels in the early stages of both cultures.

Influences on Egyptian trade and art (3500–3200 BCE)

There was generally a high-level of trade between Ancient Egypt and the Near East throughout the Pre-dynastic period of Egypt, during the Naqada II (3600–3350 BCE) and Naqada III (3350–2950 BCE) phases. These were contemporary with the Late Uruk (3600–3100 BCE) and Jemdet Nasr (3100–2900 BCE) periods in Mesopotamia. The main period of cultural influence, particularly consisting in the transfer of Mesopotamian imagery, symbols and technology to Egypt, is considered to have lasted about 250 years, during the Naqada II to Dynasty I periods.

Designs and objects
Distinctly foreign objects and art forms entered Egypt during this period, indicating contacts with several parts of Western Asia. The designs that were emulated by Egyptian artists are numerous: the Uruk "priest-king" with his tunic and brimmed hat in the posture of the Master of animals, the serpopards , winged griffins, snakes around rosettes, boats with high prows, all characteristic of long established Mesopotamian art of the Late Uruk (Uruk IV, c. 3350–3200 BCE) period. The same "Priest-King" is visible in several older Mesopotamian works of art of the end of the Uruk period, such as the Blau Monuments, cylinder seals and statues. Objects such as the Gebel el-Arak knife handle, which has patently Mesopotamian relief carvings on it, have been found in Egypt, and the silver which appears in this period can only have been obtained from Asia Minor.

Mesopotamian-style pottery in Egypt (3500 BCE)

Red-slipped spouted pottery items dating to around 3500 BCE (Naqada II C/D), which were probably used for pouring water, beer or wine, suggest that Egypt was in contact with and being influenced by Mesopotamia around that time. This type of pottery was manufactured in Egypt, with Egyptian clay, but its shape, particularly the spout, is certainly Mesopotamian in origin. Such vessels were new and rare in pre-Dynastic Egypt, but had been commonly manufactured in the Mesopotamian cities of Nippur and Uruk for centuries. This indicated that Egyptians were familiar with Mesopotamian types of pottery.
The discovery of these vessels initially encouraged the development of the dynastic race theory, according to which Mesopotamians would have established the first Pharaonic line, but is now considered by many scholars to be simply indicative of cultural influence and borrowings circa 3500 BCE, although there is an established gene flow from Mesopotamia and West Asia into Egypt .

Spouted jars of Mesopotamian design start to appear in Egypt in the Naqada II period. Various Uruk pottery vases and containers have been found in Egypt in Naqada contexts, confirming that Mesopotamian finished goods were imported into Egypt, although the past contents of the jars have not been determined yet. Scientific analysis of ancient wine jars in Abydos has shown there was some high-volume wine trade with the Levant and Mesopotamia during this period.

Adoption of Mesopotamian-style maceheads

Egyptians used traditional disk-shaped maceheads during the early phase of Naqada culture, circa 4000–3400 BCE. At the end of the period, the disk-shaped macehead was replaced by the militarily superior Mesopotamian-style pear-shaped macehead as seen on the Narmer Palette. The Mesopotamian macehead was much heavier with a wider impact surface, and was capable of giving much more damaging blows than the original Egyptian disk-shaped macehead.

Cylinder seals

It is generally thought that cylinder seals were introduced from Mesopotamia to Egypt during the Naqada II period. Cylinder seals, some coming from Mesopotamia and also Elam in Ancient Iran, and some made locally in Egypt copying earlier Mesopotamian and Elamite designs in a stylized manner, have been discovered in the tombs of Upper Egypt dating to Naqada II and III, particularly in Hierakonpolis. Mesopotamian cylinder seals have been found in the Gerzean context of Naqada II, in Naqada and Hiw, attesting to the expansion of the Mesopotamian Jemdet Nasr culture as far as Egypt at the end of the 4th millennium BCE.

In Egypt, cylinder seals suddenly appear without any local antecedents from around Naqada II c-d (3500–3300 BCE). The designs are similar to and clearly inspired by those of Mesopotamia, where they were invented during the early 4th millennium BCE, during the Uruk period, as an evolutionary step from various accounting systems and seals going back as early as the early 7th millennium BCE in Mesopotamia. The earliest Egyptian cylinder seals are clearly similar to earlier and contemporary Uruk seals down to Naqada II-d (circa 3300 BCE), and may even have been manufactured by Mesopotamian craftsmen and subsequently sold to the Egyptians, but they start to diverge from circa 3300 BCE to become more Egyptian in character.

Cylinder seals were made in Egypt as late as the Second Intermediate Period, but they were essentially replaced by scarabs from the time of the Middle Kingdom.

Other objects and designs
Lapis lazuli was imported in great quantity by Egypt, and already used in many tombs of the Naqada II period. Lapis lazuli probably originated in what is today northern Afghanistan, as no other sources are known, and had to be transported across the Iranian plateau to Mesopotamia as part of the established Mesopotamian trade network with South and Central Asia, and from there sold on to Egypt by the Mesopotamians.

In addition, Egyptian objects were created which clearly mimic Mesopotamian forms, although not slavishly. Cylinder seals appear in Egypt, as well as recessed paneling architecture, the Egyptian reliefs on cosmetic palettes are clearly made in the same style as the earlier and contemporary Mesopotamian Uruk culture, and the ceremonial mace heads which turn up from the late Gerzean and early Semainean are crafted in the Mesopotamian "pear-shaped" style, instead of the Egyptian native style. The first man/animal composite creatures in Egypt were directly copied from earlier Mesopotamian designs. It is also considered as certain that the Egyptians adopted from Mesopotamia the practice of marking the sealing of jars with engraved cylinder seals for informational purposes.

Temples and pyramids

Egyptian architecture also was influenced, as it adopted various elements of earlier Mesopotamian temple and civic architecture.

Recessed niches in particular, which are characteristic of Mesopotamian temple architecture, were adopted for the design of false doors in the tombs of the First Dynasty and Second Dynasty, from the time of the Naqada III period (circa 3000 BCE). It is unknown if the transfer of this design was the result of Mesopotamian builders and architects in Egypt, or if temple designs on imported Mesopotamian seals may have been a sufficient source of inspiration for Egyptian architects to manage themselves.

The design of the ziggurat, which appeared in Mesopotamia in the late 5th millennium BCE, was clearly a precursor to and an influence on the Egyptian pyramids, especially the stepped designs of the oldest pyramids (step pyramid), the earliest of which (Pyramid of Zoser at Saqqara) dates to circa 2600 BCE, well over two thousand years younger than Mesopotamian ziggurats/step pyramids. This again strongly suggests early cultural and technological influence on Egypt by Mesopotamia.

Transmission

The route of this trade is difficult to determine, but direct Egyptian contact with Canaan in the Levant does not predate the early dynastic era, so it is usually assumed to have been by sea trade. During the time when the dynastic race theory was still popular, it was proposed that Mesopotamian sailors circumnavigated Arabia, but a Mediterranean route, probably by middlemen through the Canaanite port of Byblos, is also likely, as evidenced by the presence of Canaanite Byblian objects in Egypt. Glyptic art also seems to have played a key role, through the circulation of decorated cylinder seals across the Levant, a common hinterland of both empires, particularly Mesopotamia.

The intensity of the exchanges suggest however that the contacts between Egypt and Mesopotamia were often direct, rather than merely through middlemen or through trade. Uruk had known colonial outposts of as far as Habuba Kabira, in modern Syria, insuring their presence in the Levant. Numerous Uruk cylinder seals have also been uncovered there. There have been suggestions that Uruk may have had a colonial outpost and a form of colonial presence in northern Egypt. The site of Buto in particular was suggested, but it has been rejected as a possible candidate.

The fact that so many Gerzean sites are at the mouths of wadis which lead to the Red Sea may indicate some amount of trade via the Red Sea (though Byblian trade potentially could have crossed the Sinai and then be taken to the Red Sea). Also, it is considered unlikely that something as complicated as recessed panel architecture could have worked its way into Egypt by proxy, and a possibly significant contingent of Mesopotamian migrants or settlers is often suspected.

These early contacts probably acted as a sort of catalyst for the development of Egyptian culture, particularly in respect to the inception of writing, the codification of royal and vernacular imagery and architectural innovations.

Importance of local Egyptian developments

While there is clear evidence the Naqada II culture borrowed abundantly from Mesopotamia, there is also a commonly held view that many of the achievements of the later First Dynasty were also the result of a long period of indigenous cultural and political development. Such developments are much older than the Naqada II period, the Naqada II period had a large degree of continuity with the Naqada I period, and the changes which did happen during the Naqada periods happened over significant amounts of time.

Although there are many examples of Mesopotamian influence in Egypt in the 4th millennium BCE, the reverse is not true, and there are no traces of Egyptian influence in Mesopotamia at any time, clearly indicating a one way flow of ideas. Only very few Egyptian Naqada period object have been found beyond Egypt, and generally in its vicinity, such as a rare Naqada III Egyptian cosmetic palette in the shape of a fish, of the end of 4th millennium BCE, found in Ashkelon or Gaza.

The current position of modern scholarship is that the Egyptian civilization was an indigenous Nile Valley development and that the archaeological evidence "strongly supports an African origin" of the ancient Egyptians.

Development of writing (3500–3200 BCE)

It is generally thought that Egyptian hieroglyphs "came into existence a century or so after Sumerian script, and were probably invented under the influence of the latter", and that it is "probable that the general idea of expressing words of a language in writing was brought to Egypt from Sumerian Mesopotamia". The two writing systems are in fact quite similar in their initial stages, relying heavily on pictographic forms and then evolving a parallel system for the expression of phonetic sounds.

Standard reconstructions of the development of writing generally place the development of the Sumerian proto-cuneiform script before the development of Egyptian hieroglyphs, with the strong suggestion the former influenced the latter.

There is however a lack of direct evidence that Mesopotamian writing influenced Egyptian form, and "no definitive determination has been made as to the origin of hieroglyphics in ancient Egypt". Some scholars point out that "a very credible argument can also be made for the independent development of writing in Egypt..." 
Since the 1990s, the discovery of glyphs on clay tags at Abydos, dated to between 3400 and 3200 BCE, may challenge the classical notion according to which the Mesopotamian symbol system predates the Egyptian one, although perhaps tellingly, Egyptian writing does make a 'sudden' appearance at that time with no antecedents or precursors, while on the contrary Mesopotamia already had a long evolutionary history of sign usage in tokens dating back to circa 8000 BCE, followed by Proto-Cuneiform. Pittman proposes that the Abydos clay tags are almost identical to contemporary clay tags from Uruk, Mesopotamia.

Egyptian scholar Gamal Mokhtar argued that the inventory of hieroglyphic symbols derived from "fauna and flora used in the signs [which] are essentially African" and in "regards to writing, we have seen that a purely Nilotic, hence African origin not only is not excluded, but probably reflects the reality" although he acknowledged the geographical location of Egypt made it a receptacle for many influences.

2017 DNA Genome Study

A 2017 study of the mitochondrial DNA and Genome wide DNA composition of Egyptian mummies has shown a high level of affinity with the DNA of the populations of Western Asia and Anatolia. The study was made on mummies of Abusir el-Meleq, near El Fayum, which was inhabited from at least 3250 BCE until about 700 CE. A shared drift analysis of the ancient Egyptian mummies is highest with ancient populations from the Levant and Anatolia, and to a lesser extent modern populations from the Near East and the Levant. the Admixture analysis and PCA show the most affinity to ancient and modern middle eastern populations.

Overall the mummies studied were closer genetically to near easterners than the modern Egyptian or indeed nearby Libyan or Sudanese populations, who today have a greater proportion of genes (8% more) coming from sub-Saharan Africa which probably arrived after the Roman period.

The data suggest a very high level of genetic input from Western Asia since ancient times, probably going back to Prehistoric Egypt and as far back as the Neolithic Era: "Our data seem to indicate close admixture and affinity at a much earlier date, which is unsurprising given the long and complex connections between Egypt and the Middle East. These connections date back to Prehistory and occurred at a variety of scales, including overland and maritime commerce, diplomacy, colonisation, immigration, invasion and deportation".

The study stated that "our genetic time transect suggests genetic continuity between the Pre-Ptolemaic, Ptolemaic and Roman populations of Abusir el-Meleq, indicating that foreign rule impacted the [native] population only to a very limited degree at the genetic level."

The study's authors cautioned that the mummies may be unrepresentative of the Ancient Egyptian population as a whole.

Gourdine, Anselin and Keita criticised the methodology of the Scheunemann et al. study and argued that the Sub-Saharan "genetic affinities" may be attributed to "early settlers" and "the relevant Sub-Saharan genetic markers" do not correspond with the geography of known trade routes".

In 2022, Danielle Candelora noted several limitations with the 2017 Scheunemann et al. study such as its “untested sampling methods, small sample size and problematic comparative data” which she argued had been misused to legitimise racist conceptions of Ancient Egypt with “scientific evidence”

Egyptian influence on Mesopotamian art

After this early period of exchange, and the direct introduction of Mesopotamian components into Egyptian culture, Egypt soon started to assert its own style from the Early Dynastic Period (3150–2686 BCE), the Narmer palette being seen as a turning point.

Egypt seems to have provided some artistic feedback to Mesopotamia at the time of the Early Dynastic Period of Mesopotamia (2900–2334 BCE). This is especially the case with royal iconography: the figure of the king smiting his enemies with a mace, and the depiction of dead enemies being eaten by birds of prey appeared in Egypt from the time of the Narmer palette, and were then adopted centuries later (possibly from Egypt) by Mesopotamian rulers Eannatum and Sargon of Akkad. This depiction appears to be part of an artistic system to promote "hegemonistic kingship". Another example is the usage of decorated mace heads as a symbol of kingship.

There is also a possibility that the depictions of the Mesopotamian king with a muscular, naked, upper body fighting his enemies in a quadrangular posture, as seen in the Stele of Naram-Sin or statues of Gudea (all circa 2000 BCE) were derived from Egyptian sculpture, which by that time had already been through its Golden Age during the Old Kingdom.

Later periods

Trade of Indus goods through Mesopotamia

Etched carnelian beads

Rare etched carnelian bead have been found in Egypt, which are thought to have been imported from the Indus Valley civilization via Mesopotamian states of Sumer, Akkad and Assyria. This is related to the flourishing of the Indus Valley civilization, and the development of Indus-Mesopotamia relations from 2600 BCE to 1900 BCE. Examples of etched carnelian beads found in Egypt typically date to the Late Middle Kingdom. They were found in tombs and represented luxury items, often as the centerpiece of jewelry.

Hyksos period

Egypt records various exchanges with Semitic West Asian foreigners from around 1900 BCE, as in the paintings of the tomb of Khnumhotep II at Beni Hassan.

From circa 1650 BCE, the Hyksos, Semitic foreigners of Canaanite Levantine origin, established the Fifteenth Dynasty of Egypt (1650–1550 BCE) based at the city of Avaris in the Nile delta, from where they ruled the northern part of the country. Khyan, one of the Hyksos rulers, is known for his wide-ranging contacts, as objects in his name have been found at Knossos and Hattusha indicating diplomatic contacts with the Minoans of Crete and the Hittites and Hurrians of Anatolia, and a sphinx with his name was bought on the art market at Baghdad and might demonstrate diplomatic contacts with the Mesopotamian states of Assyria and Babylonia, possibly with the first Kassites ruler Gandash.

Exchanges would again flourish between the two cultures from the period of the New Kingdom of Egypt and the Middle Assyrian Empire this time an exchange between two mature and well-established civilizations. These exchanges also included tributes of gold paid to Assyrian kings during the 16th and 15th centuries BC, in an attempt to ellicit their support in Egypt's conflict with the Hittite and Hurrian-Mitanni empires. Assyria eventually annexed much of the territory of the former, and completely destroyed the latter, and the growing power of Assyria may have been a factor in Egypt withdrawing from their Levantine colonies, which were subsequently annexed by the Middle Assyrian Empire which came to dominate Western Asia and the East Mediterranean. In the 11th century BC the Assyrian king Ashur-bel-kala is known to have received a tribute of exotic animals and plants from Egypt for his Zoological and Botanical gardens in Assur.

Neo-Assyrian Empire 

In the last phase of historic exchanges during the Neo-Assyrian Empire (935 BC-605 BC), the Assyrian conquest of Egypt occurred, and Assyrian rule and influence lasted till 655 BC. after Assyria had invaded and conquered Egypt with remarkable speed, defeating and driving out the Nubian Kushite Empire, the 25th Dynasty of Egypt, which had provoked Assyria by repeatedly but unsuccessfully attempting to gain an influence in the Southern Levant and Northern Arabian Peninsula by instigating and supporting rebellions by Israelites, Judeans, Moabites, Edomites, Phoenicians and Arabs against Assyrian rule during the reigns of Shalmaneser IV, Sargon II and Sennacherib.

The Egyptian 26th Dynasty had been installed in 663 BC as native puppet rulers by the Assyrians after the destruction and deportation of the foreign Nubians of the 25th Dynasty by king Esarhaddon and then came under the dominion of his successors Ashurbanipal. However, during the fall of the Neo Assyrian Empire between 612 and 599 BC, Egypt attempted to aid its former masters probably due to the fear that without a strong Assyrian buffer they too would be overrun, having already been raided by marauding Scythians. As a result, Egypt came into conflict with Assyria's fellow Mesopotamian state of Babylonia, which along with the Medes, Persians, Chaldeans, Cimmerians and Scythians, amongst others, were fighting to throw off Assyrian rule, and Pharaoh Necho II fought alongside the last Assyrian emperor Ashur-uballit II (612-c.605 BC) against Nabopolassar, Cyaxares and their allies for a time. After the Assyrian Empire fell, Egypt engaged in a number of conflicts with Babylonia during the late 7th and early 6th century BC in the Levant, before being driven from the region by Nebuchadnezzar II of Babylonia.

Achaemenid Empire
The Achaemenid Empire, though Iranic and not Mesopotamian, was heavily influenced by Mesopotamia in its art, architecture, written script and civil administration, the Persians having previously been subjects of Assyria for centuries, invaded Egypt and established satrapies, founding the Achaemenid Twenty-seventh Dynasty of Egypt (525–404 BCE) and Thirty-first Dynasty of Egypt (343–332 BCE).

See also
Indus–Mesopotamia relations
Ancient Egypt
Fertile Crescent
Mesopotamia
Neolithic Revolution
Sumer
Assyria
Babylonia
Archaeogenetics of the Near East

References

4th-millennium BC establishments
4th-century BC disestablishments in Egypt
Ancient international relations
Egypt–Iraq relations
History of Egypt
History of Mesopotamia
Uruk period